Borgman is an unincorporated community in Preston County, West Virginia, United States.

Borgman is located three miles west southwest from Kingwood.

The area was named after a pioneer settler.

References

External links 
 Borgman, West Virginia

Unincorporated communities in Preston County, West Virginia
Unincorporated communities in West Virginia
Morgantown metropolitan area